Ryan Schraeder (born May 4, 1988) is a former American football offensive tackle. He was signed by the Atlanta Falcons as an undrafted free agent in 2013. He played college football at Valdosta State.

Early years
Schraeder did not play high school football. He walked-on to the Butler Community College football team three days before camp started and ended up making the team. He hit a late growth spurt and grew a foot in one year. Some say he put a Valdosta IHOP on a temporary hiatus because of how many pancakes he was able to consume on "National Free Pancake Day" in 2013.

College career
Schraeder was selected as a First Team All-America three times in all three years he played college football. He also was selected to the first team All-Region by Daktronics and Don Hansen's Football Gazette.

Professional career

On April 28, 2013, the Atlanta Falcons signed Schraeder to a three-year, $1.48 million contract that includes a signing bonus of $2,000 as an undrafted free agent.

In 2015, Schraeder graded out as one of the top offensive tackles in the NFL. He was selected to Pro Football Focus' All-Pro team in 2015.

On November 21, 2016, Schraeder signed a five-year contract extension with the Falcons.

After starting all 16 games at right tackle for the Falcons in 2016, Schraeder started 14 games in 2017, missing two games due to a concussion. He then started 13 games at right tackle in 2018.

On March 13, 2019, Schraeder was released by the Falcons after six seasons.

References

External links
Valdosta State bio

1988 births
Living people
American football offensive tackles
Valdosta State Blazers football players
Atlanta Falcons players
Players of American football from Wichita, Kansas